Garo may refer to:

People and languages
 Garo people, a tribal people in India
 Garo language, the language spoken by the Garo tribe

Places
 Kingdom of Garo, a former kingdom in southern Ethiopia
 Garo, Colorado
 Garo Hills, part of the Garo-Khasi range in Meghalaya, India

Persons
 Garo (name), an Armenian given name
 Emma Garo, a judge from the Solomon Islands
 Isabelle Garo, a French philosopher
 Garo, a character from the manga series One-Punch Man

Film and television

Japanese
 Garo (franchise), a Japanese tokusatsu TV franchise
 Garo (TV series), sometimes referred to as Golden Knight Garo, Japanese tokusatsu television series
 Garo: Yami o Terasu Mono, a Japanese tokusatsu television series, premiering April 2013
 Garo: Makai no Hana, Japanese tokusatsu television drama. Fourth television series in the Garo metaseries, premiering April 2014
 Garo: Gold Storm Sho, both a film and the fifth television series in the Garo metaseries
 Garo: Kami no Kiba, 2017 dark fantasy tokusatsu theatrical film, the eighth feature film in the Garo franchise. It first screened on October 31, 2017
 Garo: The Animation, Japanese anime series based on the Garo tokusatsu drama. It includes:
 Garo: The Carved Seal of Flames, premiering October 2014
 Garo: Crimson Moon, premiering October 2015
 Garo: Divine Flame, premiering May 2016 
 Garo: Vanishing Line, premiering October 2017
 Garo: Red Requiem, 2010 Japanese 3-D film 
 Garo: Soukoku no Maryu, 2013 Japanese film
 Garo Gaiden: Tougen no Fue, 2013 Japanese film based on the Garo TV series
 Garo: Makai Retsuden, an omnibus television series which features the cast of the several live action series produced along the years in the Garo metaseries, celebrating its 10th anniversary

Music
 Garo Project, a Japanese musical ensemble made up of the cast of the Garo television series
 Garo (band), a Japanese rock group

Others
 Garo, a type of enemy from the Legend of Zelda series of video games, which debuted in Majora's Mask.
 Garo (magazine), a Japanese monthly manga anthology magazine

Other
 Garo Baptist Convention, a Protestant denomination of the ethnic group in India, mostly in Meghalaya
 Garo National Council, a political party in Meghalaya in north-eastern India
 Garo (fish), a genus of fish from the family Chaudhuriidae

See also
 Karo (film), sometimes pronounced Garo, a 1937 adventure-war film directed by Artashes Hay-Artyan and S. Taits
 Garos, a commune in the Pyrénées-Atlantiques department in south-western France
 Garou (disambiguation)

Language and nationality disambiguation pages

hy:Կարո (այլ կիրառումներ)